Victor Yan Souza Santos (born 23 January 2001), known as Victor Yan, is a Brazilian footballer who plays as a midfielder for Cuiabá.

Club career

Santos
Born in Taboão da Serra, Victor Yan joined Santos' youth setup in 2011, aged ten. On 29 August 2017, he signed his first professional contract with the club, lasting until August 2022.

In January 2018, Victor Yan was promoted to the first team squad by new manager Jair Ventura. He made his senior debut aged 16 on 11 March 2018, coming on as a 77th-minute substitute for fellow youth graduate Robson Bambu in a 3–1 Campeonato Paulista home loss against São Bento. He suffered a fractured ankle in training two days later and subsequently had surgery, keeping him sidelined for three months. Victor Yan returned to the under-20 squad in August 2018 but was unable to establish himself as a regular starter for the side.

For the 2019 season, Victor Yan continued with the under-20 team. On 23 May 2019, he made his under-23 debut in the Campeonato Brasileiro Sub-23. He continued to move between the under-20 and under-23 teams but struggled to break back into the first team. In April 2021, Victor Yan was named as a substitute for the first team for a Campeonato Paulista game against Corinthians and again against Red Bull Bragantino but did not make an appearance in either game. In November 2021, he took legal action in an attempt to leave Santos, questioning the length of his five-year contract set to expire in August 2022 but his appeal was rejected in court and he returned to train with the under-20 team, later changing agents and expressing a desire to stay and win a place on the team. Having been registered for the team's 2022 Copa São Paulo de Futebol Júnior squad, he was late cut on 31 December 2021, surprising both the player and his agent. Able to sign a pre-contract from 28 February 2022, Yan's representatives reportedly held talks with clubs in Portugal, Spain, Greece and Netherlands, as efforts to end his time at Santos intensified.

Orlando City
On 14 April 2022, it was announced Orlando City B had completed the signing of Victor Yan to an MLS Next Pro contract. Santos reportedly retained a 20% sell-on fee. He made 20 appearances, scoring his only goal on 21 May, in a 6–0 win over Inter Miami CF II.

Cuiabá
On 9 February 2023, Victor Yan returned to his home country after agreeing to a deal with Cuiabá.

International career
On 16 February 2017, Victor Yan was called up to Brazil under-17s to contest the 2017 South American Under-17 Football Championship. He appeared once, starting in a 2–0 win against Argentina as Brazil won the tournament. He also featured in the 2017 Montaigu Tournament and represented Brazil at the 2017 FIFA U-17 World Cup, making one appearance in a round of 16 victory against Honduras.

Career statistics

Honours

International
Brazil U17
South American Under-17 Football Championship: 2017
FIFA U-17 World Cup third-place: 2017

References

External links
Santos FC profile 

2001 births
Living people
Brazilian footballers
Association football midfielders
Santos FC players
Orlando City B players
Cuiabá Esporte Clube players
MLS Next Pro players
Brazil youth international footballers
Brazilian expatriate footballers
Brazilian expatriate sportspeople in the United States
Expatriate soccer players in the United States
People from Taboão da Serra